Zarzalico is a village in Murcia, Spain. It is part of the municipality of Lorca.

Lorca, Spain
Populated places in the Region of Murcia